Kanshi may refer to:

 Kanshi (poetry) (漢詩), Chinese poetry written by Japanese
 Kanshi, Fujian (坎市镇), town in Yongding District, Longyan, Fujian, China
 Kanshi, India, town in Meerut, Uttar Pradesh, India
 Kanshi, Mbuji-Mayi, a commune in the city of Mbuji-Mayi